The Ludlow Griscom Award for Outstanding Contributions in Regional Ornithology is an award bestowed by the American Birding Association upon individuals who are determined to have "dramatically advanced the state of ornithological knowledge for a particular region," through long-term studies of status and distribution, the writing and/or publication of field guides to birds of a certain area, work as part of a breeding bird atlas project, through the publishing of academic papers on regional ornithology, or through their efforts in inspiring and teaching about the subject of birding. 

One of five awards presented by the ABA for contributions to ornithology, the award is named after Ludlow Griscom, considered the "Dean of the Birdwatchers",  a pioneer in field ornithology, and one of the first ornithologists to stress the importance of identification of birds in the field as opposed to the collection of specimens.  The Ludlow Griscom Award was first presented to Roger Tory Peterson, considered the father of the modern field guide,  in 1980. In its early years, the award was more broadly designated to recognize "outstanding contributions to excellence in field birding." After being awarded in 1981, it was awarded biennially from 1984 to 1998; since then, it has been awarded on an annual basis.

List of winners
Since the award's inception in 1980, there have been 34 recipients, including several years in which more than one award was given.

See also

 List of ornithology awards

References

Ornithology awards
American Birding Association